The Via Delphi Institute for Research on Marine Mammals is a Mexican non-profit organization endorsed to generate scientific knowledge about marine mammals, mostly of the Tursiops truncatus species. The research center is located in the state of Quintana Roo, near Cancún, where the scientific members make indoor studies; by the other side, The Via Delphi Institute conducts research programs with wild dolphin populations from the Campeche and Tabasco costs, in the Gulf of Mexico, and in Holbox Island, located in the Mexican Caribbean sea. 
The institute is divided in two working groups, one composed of biologists and the other of veterinarians, both supported by thesis students and volunteers.

History and achievements
The Via Delphi Institute was formally constituted in 2007 with the sign of a Cooperation Agreement with the National Autonomous University of Mexico UNAM. This agreement establishes some sets for scientific programs between the Via Delphi Institute, the Biology Institute and the Sciences and Veterinary faculty of UNAM. 
Also, the Via Delphi Institute has worked with CINVESTAV (from the National Polytechnic Institute) in Mérida, the University of Veracruz, the University of San Nicolas de Hidalgo, Michoacán, and the Tec Institute of Seas Studies in Veracruz, among others.

Research certification
With a certification given by the RENIECYT through the National Commission of Science and Technology CONACYT, the Via Delphi Institute receives official support from this recognized public commission, providing it an important status in the Mexican scientific research field. 
As a result of the institute's research more than 61 works had been submitted in various worldwide forums, including: The Annual Meeting of the Marine Mammal Society, IMATA, The International Association of Aquatic Mammals and the meetings of the International Association of Aquatic Mammals Medicine.

Tursiops truncatus Breeding program
One of the most successful projects of the Via Delphi Institute is the Tursiops truncatus breeding program. This program has been optimized for 17 years, reaching a meticulous system of veterinary medicine and medical training. The result of this period of work has permitted to reach a survival average of 70%. During the 2008 Via Delphi reached a 100% survival rate, obtaining a record never registered of 11 successful births. The previous achievement inscribes the Via Delphi's Breeding program on the Guinness World Records.

Via Delphi Institute research programs

 Noninvasive monitoring of reproductive stages in dolphins Tursiops truncatus in natural limited environments by the quantification of fecal steroids and reproductive behavioral observation and its ultrasound correlation.
 Abundance and distribution registration of dolphins Tursiops truncatus in the coast area of the Ria Lagartos biosphere, Yucatán, Mexico.
 Follow of identified dolphins in Laguna de Términos, Campeche.
 Registry Birth, growth and behavioral development of offspring born in limited natural environments.
 Morfometric registry of dolphins under guarded at Via Delphi Group.
 Registry of maternal care in female Tursiops truncatus with different levels of experience establishing dominance hierarchies in dolphins kept in limited natural environments.
 Registration of marine mammals stranded on the shores of the Gulf of Mexico and the Caribbean.
 Growth recording of a baby manatee Trichechus manatus manatus rescued and rehabilitated in the Via Delphi Group facilities.
 Genetic characterization of Tursiops truncatus dolphins kept in limited natural environments.

Institutional collaboration
 UNAM
 CONACYT
 SOMEMMA, Mexican Society for Marine Mammalogy
 IAAAM, International Association for Aquatic Animal Medicine
 SMM, The Society for Marine Mammalogy
 IMATA, International Marine Animal Trainers Association

References

 UNAM e-journal of Ph.D Alberto Delgado, Via Delphi Institute Director.
 Sonar Journal
 Review of the Collaboration Agreement with UNAM
 DELGADO ESTRELLA, A. Toninas Tursiops truncatus Ecology population in Laguna de Yalahau, Q. Roo, México. Master Thesis. UNAM, 1996.
 Comparison of Tursiops truncatus population parameters along the southeast costs of the Gulf of México (Tabasco, Campeche, Yucatán y Quintana Roo) Ph. D Thesis. UNAM, 2002.

Marine mammals
Marine conservation organizations
Scientific organizations based in Mexico
Zoology organizations
Animal welfare organizations based in Mexico
Buildings and structures in Quintana Roo
Fauna of the Caribbean
Gulf Coast of Mexico